Konar Helaleh (also Romanized as Konār Helāleh; also known as Halāleh and Helāleh) is a village in Shahid Modarres Rural District, in the Central District of Shushtar County, Khuzestan Province, Iran. At the 2006 census, its population was 119, in 23 families.

References 

Populated places in Shushtar County